Glenhuntly railway station is located on the Frankston line in Victoria, Australia. It serves the south-eastern Melbourne suburb of Glen Huntly, and it opened on 19 December 1881 as Glen Huntly Road. It was renamed Glen Huntly on 1 September 1882, and renamed Glenhuntly on 20 April 1937.

The station is located next to a tram square, one of only three remaining level crossings in Melbourne at which tram and train tracks intersect, along with their electrified overhead wires. A small signal box is located at the Flinders Street end of the tram square, which controls the tramway crossing.

History

Glenhuntly station opened on 19 December 1881, when the railway line from Caulfield was extended to Mordialloc. Like the suburb itself, the station was named after the ship Glen Huntly, which docked at Point Ormond (then known as Little Red Bluff) on 7 April 1840 with typhus fever onboard. A track leading to the Point and subsequent quarantine station was later named Glen Huntly Road.

During March/April 1975, the former briquette depot at the station was demolished. In 1977, the station was closed to goods traffic.

In 1986, a crossover that was located at the Down end of the station was abolished.

In the mid 1980s, as part of works to add a third track on the Frankston line, the western platform was converted to an island platform. During this time, the original station building, built in the 1880s, was demolished and replaced with the present brick structure, which was opened on 1 July 1987 by the then Minister for Transport Tom Roper, and former Member for Glenhuntly Dr. Gerard Vaughan. It was also during this time that boom barriers were provided at the Glen Huntly Road and the nearby Neerim Road level crossings, in 1986 and 1987 respectively. On 28 June 1987, the Up face of the island platform was brought into use.

In November 2016, three women and one girl were attacked by a man with a knife at the station. A 45-year-old man from Carnegie was later arrested.

On 30 November 2018, the Level Crossing Removal Project announced that the Glenhuntly Road and Nerrim Road level crossings will be grade separated, with the project expected to be completed by 2024. On 21 June 2021, designs for the rebuilt station were revealed, showing that the level crossings will be removed by lowering the railway line into an approximate 1km trench.

Platforms and services

Glenhuntly has one island platform with two faces, and one side platform. During the morning peak-hour period, Frankston-bound services use Platform 3 and Flinders Street services use Platform 1. Platform 2, during the morning peak-hour, is used for express services which mostly don't stop at Glenhuntly. In the evening peak-hour period, Frankston-bound services use Platform 2 whilst express services pass the station through Platform 3.

It is serviced by Metro Trains' Frankston line services.

Platform 1:
  all stations services to Flinders Street, Werribee and Williamstown

Platform 2:
  morning peak-hour all stations services to Flinders Street, Werribee and Williamstown; all stations services to Frankston

Platform 3:
  morning peak-hour all stations services to Frankston

Transport links

Yarra Trams operates one route via Glenhuntly station:
 : Melbourne University – Carnegie

Gallery

References

External links
 Melway map at street-directory.com.au

Railway stations in Australia opened in 1881
Railway stations in Melbourne
Railway stations in the City of Glen Eira